Charles Thomas Clibbon (3 February 1895 – 4 April 1975) was an English long-distance runner who competed at the 1920 and 1924 Summer Olympics. In 1920 he failed to finish his 10,000 m final race, and in 1924 he placed sixth in the 5000 m and 14th in the 10,000 m.

Clibbon finished fourth at the 1920 International Cross Country Championships, winning a gold medal with the English team.

References

1895 births
1975 deaths
People from Ware, Hertfordshire
English male long-distance runners
Olympic athletes of Great Britain
Athletes (track and field) at the 1920 Summer Olympics
Athletes (track and field) at the 1924 Summer Olympics